Promenade Bellerive Park is an urban park in the Mercier–Hochelaga-Maisonneuve borough of Montreal, Quebec, Canada. It is located in between Notre Dame Street East and the Saint Lawrence River. It is  large. Throughout its approximately 2km length, it faces the Boucherville Islands and Charron Island. A ferry service to Charron Island runs during the summer.

History
The City of Montreal obtained the land that would become Promenade Bellerive Park in 1893, following a land swap with the Canadian Pacific Railway (CPR). As part of the deal, CPR obtained a piece of land in Old Montreal on which Place Viger would eventually be constructed. In the 1960s, the City of Montreal first announced its plans to convert its waterfront land into a park. The land was then used for the storage of road salt. During the winter the land was used by the city to dump snow into the river.

Local citizens became frustrated at the slow pace it took for site to be transformed into a park. They worked with their local elected officials to facilitate the beginning of the work. In 1995, a floating dock was installed, providing summer ferry service to the Boucherville Islands. In 1997, most of the landscaping work was done and the welcome centre was built.

Art

In 2009, the sculpture Continuum 2009 (à la mémoire de Pierre Perrault) was installed in the park. It is a three-element abstract artwork made of weathering steel. The sculpture was created by Roland Poulin, in tribute to the filmmaker Pierre Perrault. Three elements form a series of vertical and horizontal planes that frame an empty space. People can enter the artwork by walking through its frame.

References

External links
Société d'animation de la Promenade Bellerive 

Parks in Montreal
Mercier–Hochelaga-Maisonneuve
Outdoor sculptures in Montreal
Redeveloped ports and waterfronts in Canada